Cereus jamacaru, known as mandacaru or cardeiro, is a cactus native to central and eastern Brazil.

A thorn-less kind is used for animal feed. The most common kind is highly thorny but is also used for animal feed, after burning or cutting off the thorns. Mandacaru is highly drought-resistant.

The flower buds usually appear in the middle of spring and each flower lasts only for a night. They blossom at dusk and wither by the morning. Its fruit has a very strong violet color. The pulp is white with tiny black seeds, and it is considered very tasty. Many birds feed on them, like the "gralha-cancã" and the "periquito-da-caatinga" from Brazilian caatinga.

The mandacaru is featured on the flag of the city of Petrolina in the state of Pernambuco.

References

jamacaru